Sir Pelham Grenville Wodehouse,  (1881–1975) was a prolific English author, humorist and scriptwriter. After being educated at Dulwich College, to which he remained devoted all his life, he was employed by a bank, but disliked the work and wrote magazine pieces in his spare time. In 1902 he published his first novel, The Pothunters, set at the fictional public school of St. Austin's; his early stories continued the school theme. He also used the school setting in his short story collections, which started in 1903 with the publication of Tales of St. Austin's.

Throughout his novel- and story-writing career Wodehouse created several renowned regular comic characters with whom the public became familiar. These include Bertie Wooster and his valet Jeeves; the immaculate and loquacious Psmith; Lord Emsworth and the Blandings Castle set; the disaster-prone opportunist Ukridge; the Oldest Member, with stories about golf; and Mr Mulliner, with tales on numerous subjects from film studios to the Church of England.

Wodehouse also wrote scripts and screenplays and, in August 1911, his script A Gentleman of Leisure was produced on the Broadway stage. In the 1920s and 1930s he collaborated with Jerome Kern and Guy Bolton in an arrangement that "helped transform the American musical" of the time; in the Grove Dictionary of American Music Larry Stempel writes, "By presenting naturalistic stories and characters and attempting to integrate the songs and lyrics into the action of the libretto, these works brought a new level of intimacy, cohesion, and sophistication to American musical comedy." His writing for plays also turned into scriptwriting, starting with the 1915 film A Gentleman of Leisure. He joined Metro-Goldwyn-Mayer (MGM) in 1930 for a year, and then worked for RKO Pictures in 1937.

At the outbreak of the Second World War, and while living in northern France, Wodehouse was captured by the Germans and was interned for over a year. After his release he was tricked into making five comic and apolitical broadcasts on German radio to the still neutral US. After vehement protests in Britain, Wodehouse never returned to his home country, despite being cleared by an MI5 investigation. He moved to the US permanently in 1947 and took American citizenship in 1955, retaining his British nationality. He continued writing until his death in 1975.

Novels

Initially in chronological order by UK publication date, even when the book was published first in the US or serialised in a magazine in advance of publication in book form.

Short story collections

In chronological order by UK publication date, even when the book was published first in the US or serialised in a magazine in advance of publication in book form.

Individual short stories

Wodehouse wrote more than 300 short stories. Many of these stories were originally published in magazines and subsequently published in short story collections. Wodehouse also contributed other works to periodicals such as articles and poems, and some of Wodehouse's novels were originally serialised in magazines as well.

Plays

Films

Autobiographies and miscellany

The following is a collection of published autobiographical and miscellaneous work. There are transcripts available of the five broadcasts he made, available online, including through the PG Wodehouse Society (UK).

References and sources

References

Sources

 
 
 
 
 
 
 
 
 
 
  
 
 
 
 

Bibliographies by writer
Bibliographies of British writers
 
P. G. Wodehouse